Copperas Cove  is a city located in central Texas at the southern corner of Coryell County with smaller portions in Lampasas and Bell counties. Founded in 1879 as a small ranching and farming community, today the city is the largest in Coryell County, with 32,032 residents as of the 2010 census and an estimated 33,235 residents in 2019. The city's economy is closely linked to nearby Fort Hood, making it part of the Killeen-Temple-Fort Hood Metropolitan Statistical Area. Locals usually refer to the town as just "Cove".

History

The first evidence of human habitation in the Five Hills area dates back to at least 4,000 BCE. Artifacts, such as skeletal remains, arrowheads, and other stone tools, have been found along local creek beds and valley floors.  These first residents were nomadic hunters, traveling in small groups following migrating buffalo herds. When the Spanish came to Texas, a small Plains tribe known as the Tonkawa inhabited the area. The powerful Comanche controlled a vast stretch of land to the north and west, making Coryell County a hostile battleground as settlers moved into the area.

In 1825, Mexico provided Stephen F. Austin with a land grant encompassing a large area including present-day Copperas Cove. Starting in the 1830s, the first white settlers came into the Five Hills region; however, the area lacked stability until after the Civil War. Substantial settlement did not arrive until the development of the cattle industry during the 1870s, when a feeder route of the Chisholm Trail was cut through the region. Settlement centered around a local general store about two miles southwest of present-day downtown. In 1878, residents applied for a post office under the name "Cove", so chosen for the site's sheltered location. However "Cove" was already taken by a nearby community (now called Evant). Inspired by the taste of nearby spring water, residents amended the name to "Copperas Cove" (officially in 1901). The post office was established in March 1879, with Marsden Ogletree as the town's first postmaster. The original building remains today and is the site of the Ogletree Gap Heritage Festival.

Copperas Cove's fortunes were greatly improved when, in 1882, the Gulf, Colorado and Santa Fe Railway expanded into the region. Local resident Jesse M. Clements lobbied to obtain train service and provided the railroad company with the necessary right-of-way about two miles northeast of town. Residents soon moved to a new set of streets laid out by the company's engineer, E.F. Batte. The train depot at Copperas Cove served as the shipping point for farmers and ranchers in the area between Cowhouse Creek and the Lampasas River. Businesses opened to provide services for these area residents, including a steam gristmill-cotton gin, three hotels, a barber shop, and an opera house. Many of the town's early buildings remain to this day, focusing around the block of Avenue D between Main Street and 1st Street. By 1900, the population had reached 475, and residents voted to form their own school district. A private bank opened in 1906, and residents elected Jouett Allin their first mayor in 1913. The town continued to prosper over the coming years, depending largely on local agriculture, of which cotton played a dominant role. Copperas Cove reached a then-peak population of 600 in 1929, but entered a state of decline with the onset of the Great Depression. During the 1930s, the local bank failed, several businesses closed, and many people left to look for work in other areas. By 1940, only 356 people remained.

In 1942, Copperas Cove received new life when the US government located Camp Hood next to the struggling community. By the time the cantonment was upgraded to Fort Hood in 1950, the town had over a thousand residents. The population continued to increase rapidly, reaching almost 5,000 in 1960 and more than doubling each of the next two decades, eventually coming to the present count of 32,032 at the 2010 census. During this period, the city limits greatly expanded, encompassing acres of newly built tract housing with upgraded roads and services. The establishment of the fort drastically altered the character of the city. Soldiers from across the country bring their families and settle in Copperas Cove, often remaining after concluding their military service. In addition to diversifying the ethnic and religious composition of the city, Fort Hood altered the local economy. Since much of the area farmland was acquired by the federal government, businesses within Copperas Cove now largely provide services for Fort Hood soldiers and their families.

Geography and climate

Copperas Cove is located in the Limestone Cut Plains of central Texas, within an agglomeration of hills situated between the Lampasas River and Cowhouse Creek valleys, known as the "Five Hills" area. Copperas Cove's climate is humid subtropical with hot summers, cool winters, and rainy springs. May is the rainiest month. The city lies within Tornado Alley, and twisters have been known to touch down in the area.

The area's thin layer of topsoil tends to be a light, crumbly caliche—capable of sustaining many agricultural plants, but susceptible to depletion and erosion. Before ranchers and farmers began altering the landscape, the area was once part of a vast grassland. Bison, deer, and pronghorn grazed on tall native grasses. However, because of overgrazing, land clearing, and the suppression of wildfires, these native grasses have been mostly replaced by invasive weeds and tough, woody trees, including Texas live oak, Texas red oak, red juniper (red cedar), and mesquite.

Copperas Cove has a suburban cityscape typical among American small towns developed in the post-World War II era. The majority of commercial activity occurs along the main thoroughfare, US Highway 190. Since most of Copperas Cove has been built after 1950, the extent of the town's walkable, historic downtown is considerably smaller than nearby, less populated communities, such as Lampasas or Gatesville. Most residential neighborhoods are low-density, single-family homes. Because of changing economic conditions in recent decades, intensive farming and ranching has largely left the area, making land fairly cheap to develop. After a brief slowdown of development during the 1980s, new subdivisions resumed expansion into the surrounding countryside.

Transportation

The major thoroughfare through town is Interstate 14/U.S. Highway 190, connecting Cove to Interstate 35 in Belton,  to the east, and to U.S. Highway 281 in Lampasas,  to the west. FM 116 runs north through town, connecting the city to Gatesville  to the north.

Public transportation is provided within the city by HOP, whose buses can be recognized by their teal and purple color. The region is served by the Killeen–Fort Hood Regional Airport (GRK) located a few miles outside of town.

Demographics

2020 census

As of the 2020 United States census, there were 36,670 people, 12,632 households, and 8,911 families residing in the city.

2000 census
As of the 2000 census, 29,592 people, 10,273 households, and 8,023 families resided in the city. The population density was 2,124.9 people per square mile (820.2/km). The 11,120 housing units averaged 798.5 per square mile (308.2/km). The racial makeup of the city was 65.36% White, 20.43% African American, 0.87% Native American, 2.70% Asian, 0.58% Pacific Islander, 4.98% from other races, and 5.09% from two or more races. Hispanics or Latinos of any race were 11.69% of the population.

Of the 10,273 households, 47.3% had children under the age of 18 living with them, 62.2% were married couples living together, 12.7% had a female householder with no husband present, and 21.9% were not families. About 16.7% of all households were made up of individuals, and 3.2% had someone living alone who was 65 years of age or older. The average household size was 2.85 and the average family size was 3.19.

In the city, the population was distributed as 32.0% under the age of 18, 14.2% from 18 to 24, 33.3% from 25 to 44, 15.4% from 45 to 64, and 5.1% who were 65 years of age or older. The median age was 27 years. For every 100 females, there were 98.0 males. For every 100 females age 18 and over, there were 96.3 males.

The median income for a household in the city was $37,869, and for a family was $40,517. Males had a median income of $26,406 versus $22,270 for females. The per capita income for the city was $15,995. About 8.1% of families and 9.6% of the population were below the poverty line, including 13.8% of those under age 18 and 5.9% of those age 65 or over.

Government

Local government
Copperas Cove has a council–manager municipal government. Residents elect a mayor and seven council members to three-year terms, with a two-term limit. The city council appoints a city manager, who handles the administrative functions of the municipal government. The current mayor is Dan Yancey. Elected On November 2, 2021, Inaugurated On November 16, 2021.

According to the city's 2009 Comprehensive Annual Financial Report Fund Financial Statements, the city's various funds had $16.8million in revenues, $26.7million in expenditures, $15.8million in total assets, $2.7million in total liabilities, and $20.0million in investments.

The structure of the management and coordination of city services is:

County government
At the county level, Copperas Cove votes for Coryell County Commissioner seats 1, 2, 3, and 4, which are currently held by Jack Wall, Daren Moore, Don Jones, Wyllis Ament, respectively. The County Judge is John E. Firth. Parts of Copperas Cove fall into Lampasas and Bell counties, and are represented by those county officials.

State government
The city votes overwhelmingly Republican in both state and federal elections. Most of Copperas Cove falls within the 59th District of the Texas House of Representatives, which is currently represented by Republican Sid Miller. Brian Birdwell of the 22nd District holds the State Senate seat that represents Coryell County.

Federal government
At the federal level, most of Copperas Cove is part of Texas' 25th District, which is currently represented by Republican Roger Williams. The two U.S. senators from Texas are Republicans John Cornyn and Ted Cruz.

Education

Colleges and universities
CTC offers two-year associate degrees in computer science, nursing, journalism, and other fields. Texas A&M-Central Texas shares facilities with CTC. It is a full university offering a number of four-year bachelor's degrees, as well as many master's programs.

Public school districts

Copperas Cove is served by the Copperas Cove Independent School District, including seven elementary schools, two junior highs, one high school, and an alternative learning center. Among these are:
 Elementary: Clements/Hollie Parsons, Fairview/Miss Jewell, Hettie Halstead, House Creek, J.L. Williams/Lovett Ledger, Mae Stevens, Martin Walker
 Junior High: Copperas Cove JH, S.C Lee Junior High
 High School: Copperas Cove High School
 Alternative Education: Crossroads High School

Public high schools
Copperas Cove High School's athletic teams are known as the Bulldawgs (Lady Bulldawgs for women's teams). The school's mascot is "Sparky". In recent years, Copperas Cove has produced many professional athletes, including T.J. Hollowell (NFL New York Jets and Denver Broncos), Vontez Duff (NFL New York Giants), Charles Tillman (NFL Carolina Panthers), Sherika Wright (WNBA Phoenix Mercury) and 2011 Heisman Trophy winner Robert Griffin III, backup quarterback for the Baltimore Ravens.

Economy 
According to the city's 2020 Comprehensive Annual Financial Report, the top employers in the city are:

Annual events and festivals

Rabbit Fest is a four-day arts and crafts festival held on the third weekend of May each year. Festivities include a carnival, midway, parade, chili cook-off, and many other activities.

The Ogletree Gap Heritage Festival is held at the city's original town site, the Ogletree Gap Stagecoach and Post Office. It occurs annually on the third weekend of October. Food, arts and crafts, Civil War reenactments, a petting zoo, pony rides, and kids games are available.

The Krist Kindl Markt is held on the first weekend of December in downtown Copperas Cove. It is a German-inspired open air Christmas market sponsored by the Downtown Association. It typically hosts live music and performances by local groups. There is also a night-time Christmas parade.

Begun in 2000, the Copperas Cove Classic Road Race is held mid-January each year.

The C.H.A.M.P.S. Heart of Texas Bowl is hosted by Copperas Cove at Bulldawg Stadium. The first HOT Bowl was held in 2001.

Notable people
 Robert Griffin III, Heisman Trophy-winner and NFL quarterback 
 Shaye Haver, U.S. Army 1st Lieutenant; one of the first two women ever to complete the U.S. Army Ranger School, was born in Copperas Cove
 Suzanna Gratia Hupp, survivor of the Luby's massacre, former Texas HOR for District 54, and pro-gun activist, lived in the city for sometime between 1987 and 2000. She now lives in nearby Kempner, Texas
Rashard Odomes (born 1996), basketball player in the Israeli Basketball Premier League
 Chester M. Ovnand, was one of the two American soldiers first killed in South Vietnam by the Viet Cong
 Michael Stipe, R.E.M. frontman; lived in Copperas Cove when his family returned to the US from Germany in 1972 He and his two sisters attended Copperas Cove High. In 1995, a Texas newspaper tracked down Stipe's seventh-grade math teacher. "He was a good student," said Mary Shipley. "He did really well in class. I wish I had kept his old papers. Now I ask all of my students for their autographs because you never know, there might be a future Michael Stipe in one of my classes." Shipley died in 2010. Stipe left a message in the guestbook: "Thank you for being a straight talker to your students and for trusting and not judging us; my thoughts are with you and with those you left behind."
 Charles Tillman, retired Chicago Bears and Carolina Panthers cornerback

References

External links

 
 Chamber of Commerce
 Cove Leader Press
 Copperas Cove Independent School District
 Coryell County official website
 Central Texas College
 Texas A&M-Central Texas
 The Hop

Cities in Texas
Cities in Bell County, Texas
Cities in Coryell County, Texas
Cities in Lampasas County, Texas
Fort Hood
Populated places established in 1878
Killeen–Temple–Fort Hood metropolitan area